The Flintstone Kids is an animated television series, based on the childhood years of The Flintstones. This page lists the show's episodes.

Series overview

Episodes
The segments indicate in colors by which characters starred in them:
 Blue = The Flintstone Kids (32 segments)
 Light Blue = Flintstone Funnies (13 segments)
 Magenta = Dino's Dilemmas (19 segments)
 Sky Blue = Captain Caveman and Son (19 segments)

Season 1 (1986–87)

Season 2 (1987–88)
Four of these episodes contains a new short followed by repeats of two shorts from season 1.

References

Lists of American children's animated television series episodes
The Flintstones